Cargo Fleet railway station  served the Cargo Fleet area of Middlesbrough, North East England from 1885 to 1990 as a stop on the Tees Valley line.

History 
The station was opened on 8 November 1885 by the North Eastern Railway. It was situated a mile east of  station, adjacent to Dockside Road, between junctions with Marsh Road and Works Road. Cargo Fleet was a passenger only station, although there were sidings nearby which handled goods traffic. The 1904 RCH handbook recorded that the sidings served two ironworks, (one that served a brickworks and a wharf) a warrant stores, a timber yard and wharves, a salt works and a wharf. 

On 4 May 1969 the station was one of many to be reduced to an 'unstaffed halt', which meant that the station was attractive to vandals. By 1972 the windows were boarded up, the brickwork had graffiti all over it, the lamps were smashed and the posters were ripped to the point where only peelings remained. After these buildings were demolished, a small brick shelter was built with electric lighting. 

Due to the low population of Cargo Fleet (in 1911 it was estimated to have only 682 residents) and the closure of nearby factories on the line, there was very little passenger demand. British Rail realised that the station would require an outlay of £60,000 if it remained open, so it closed completely on 22 January 1990.

References

External links 

Former North Eastern Railway (UK) stations
Railway stations in Great Britain opened in 1885
Railway stations in Great Britain closed in 1990
1885 establishments in England
1990 disestablishments in England